Boutmy may refer to:

 Émile Boutmy, French political scientist and sociologist 
 Joop Boutmy, Dutch amateur football (soccer) player who competed in the 1912 Summer Olympics
 Josse Boutmy, an organist and harpsichordist of the Austrian Netherlands